S Musics is an audio rights record owned by producer-director S. Shankar formed to release soundtracks and albums for Tamil films

Audio Released

See also
 S Shankar
 S Pictures

References

Tamil cinema